Benelli may refer to:
Benelli Armi SpA, an Italian firearm manufacturer
Benelli (motorcycles), an Italian motorcycle manufacturer
HSR-Benelli, an Austrian-Italian manufacturer of personal watercraft
Andrea Benelli (born 1960), Italian sports shooter
Giovanni Benelli (1921–1982), Italian cardinal
Manuela Benelli (born 1963), Italian volleyball player
Sem Benelli (1877–1949), Italian playwright, essayist and librettist
Vanessa Benelli Mosell (born 1987), Italian classical pianist

See also: